Andrew Drybrough (6 March 1878 - 12 September 1946) was a Scotland international rugby union player

Rugby Union career

Amateur career

Drybrough played for Edinburgh Wanderers and Merchistonians.

Provincial career

He was capped by Edinburgh District in 1902 playing in the Inter-City match against Glasgow District.

International career

He was capped 2 times for the Scotland international side, in the period 1902 to 1903.

References

1878 births
1946 deaths
Edinburgh District (rugby union) players
Edinburgh Wanderers RFC players
Merchistonian FC players
Rugby union players from Edinburgh
Scotland international rugby union players
Scottish rugby union players
Rugby union centres